Jude Speyrer (April 14, 1929 – July 21, 2013) D.D., was an American prelate of the Roman Catholic Church who served as the first bishop of the Diocese of Lake Charles, Louisiana.

Biography
Born on April 14, 1929, in Leonville, Louisiana, Speyrer was ordained to the priesthood by Bishop Maurice Schexnayder on July 25, 1953. He was appointed the first bishop of the Diocese of Lake Charles on January 29, 1980, by Pope John Paul II; he was consecrated by Bishop Gerard Louis Frey on April 25, 1980.

On December 12, 2000, John Paul II accepted Speyer's resignation as bishop of Lake Charles. Jude Speyrer died on July 21, 2013, in Opelousas, Louisiana, aged 84.

Notes

1929 births
2013 deaths
20th-century Roman Catholic bishops in the United States
People from St. Landry Parish, Louisiana
Catholics from Louisiana